Madry is an unincorporated community in northeast Barry County, in the U.S. state of Missouri. The community is located on Missouri Route 39, approximately 6.5 miles south of Aurora.

History
A post office called Madry was established in 1892, and remained in operation until 1918. The community was named after A. H. Madry, the original owner of the town site.

References

Unincorporated communities in Barry County, Missouri
Unincorporated communities in Missouri